Canadian Affair is the UK's largest tour operator to Canada, providing services including scheduled passenger airlines, package holidays, cruise lines, hotels, motorhome hire and car hire. Since it was founded in 1995, Canadian Affair has flown over one million passengers to Canada.

The company specialises in package and tailor-made travel to both Canada and Alaska, including rail tours, cruises, fly drives, escorted tours, wildlife holidays, ski holidays and activity holidays. In 2017, Canadian Affair won the British Travel Awards Gold Award for Best Holiday Company to Canada (Large) as well as the Silver Award for Best Rail Holiday Company (Large).

The company is based in the UK, and employs approximately seventy people in two offices located in London (Head Office) and Glasgow.

Ownership
On 14 July 2006, Canadian Affair was acquired by Transat A.T. for £20.4 million (approximately C$42.8 million). The deal enabled Transat's airline Air Transat to fly Canadian Affair passengers, thereby securing seat sales for its flights to Canada. The agreement was made between Transat A.T. and the Airline Seat Company, which trades as Canadian Affair.

Transat A.T.

Transat A.T. is an international tour operator and holiday travel specialist based in Montreal. The company offers vacation packages, hotel stays and air travel to some 60 destinations in 26 countries in the Americas, Europe and the Middle East. Transat operates mainly in Canada, Europe, the Caribbean, Mexico and the Mediterranean Basin. Transat is also active in air transportation, destination services and distribution.

Key people
Canadian Affair approximately 70 staff in London and Glasgow. Some of its key people include:

Chris Hedley - Managing Director
Lee Rogers - Product & Commercial Director
Tom Cook - Finance Director

Operations
Canadian Affair offers flights from London, Manchester, and Glasgow (United Kingdom), as well as Dublin, to Toronto, Montreal, Calgary and Vancouver through its flights with Air Transat.

The company also offers hotel accommodation, Avis car hire, Rocky Mountaineer train tours, self-drive holidays, Holland America Line and Celebrity cruises, motorhome hire with Fraserway, CanaDream and Cruise Canada, and escorted coach tours across Canada and Alaska.

Awards
Canadian Affair has been recognised with several awards over the past decade, including the Consumer Favourite Tour Operator Award, which it has won for the past five years at the British Annual Canada Travel Awards.

Other awards include:

 2018 - British Travel Awards - Best Holiday Company to Canada
 2018 - British Travel Awards - Best Rail Holidays Company
 2017 - British Travel Awards - Best Holiday Company to Canada
 2017 - British Travel Awards - Best Rail Holidays Company
 2016 - British Travel Awards - Best Holiday Company to Canada
 2016 - British Travel Awards - Best Rail Holidays Company
 2015 - British Annual Canada Travel Awards - Best Canadian Ski Tour Operator
 2015 - British Travel Awards - Best Holiday Company to Canada
 2015 - British Travel Awards - Silver Award for Best Rail Holidays Company
 2015 - Travolution Awards - Best Website User Experience
 2014 - British Travel Awards - Silver Award for Best Holiday Company to Canada
 2013 - BACTA Explorer Award
 2012 - CIMTIG Best Travel TV Advert - Canadian Affair is top of the Most Popular TV Advert of the Year poll launched by Chartered Institute of Marketing (CIMTIG)
 2011 - Best Tour Operator to Canada
 2010 - Best Tour Operator to Canada
 2009 - Consumer Favourite Tour Operator
 2009 - Consumer Favourite Ski Operator
 2008 - Consumer Favourite Tour Operator
 2008 - Consumer Favourite Ski Operator
 2007 - Consumer Favourite Tour Operator
 2007 - Outstanding Contribution to the Promotion of Canada
 2006 - Tourism Contribution to the province of Alberta
 2005 - Best Direct Sale Tour Operator
 2004 - Best Direct Sale Tour Operator
 2003 - Best Canada Website
 2002 - Best Canada Website

Sponsorship
Since 2006, Canadian Affair has sponsored Canada Day in London. Each year Canada Day is celebrated at Trafalgar Square, where live Canadian acts, food stalls, and day-long celebrations take place.

Since 2017, parent company Transat has sponsored the Toronto Wolfpack Rugby League team, which Canadian Affair supports by providing flight, hotel and match ticket packages for Toronto Wolfpack and UK opposition supporters.

Transat also has a partnership with SOS Children's Villages which Canadian Affair supports each year through their Big Hearts fundraising initiative.

References

External links

Air Transat
Travel and holiday companies of the United Kingdom